The 2008 Artistic Billiards World Championship was held between 1 and 5 April 2008 in Schelle, Belgium. 

Yaman Haci Arap won in the final 3–2 against Xavier Fonellosa.

Qualification

Pool A

Pool B

Pool C

Pool D

Main tournament

Round robin stage

Pool A

Pool B

Pool C

Pool D

Knock-out stage

Quarter-finals

Half-finals

Final

References

2008
Artistic Billiards World Championship
Artistic Billiards World Championship
Artistic Billiards World Championship
Cue sports in Belgium